Alfredo Deza may refer to:
 Alfredo Deza (high jumper) (born 1979), Peruvian high jumper
 Alfredo Deza (hurdler) (born 1944), his father, Peruvian hurdler